Vedran Vinko (born 22 February 1990) is a Slovenian footballer who plays as a winger.

Club career
Vinko started his career playing in the youth teams of Nafta Lendava. When he played his debut game for Nafta against Drava Ptuj, he was only 16 years old.

He has definitely established himself on the first team in the 2010–11 season, scoring 10 goals in 26 games and being appointed captain of Nafta Lendava, although the team got relegated from the Slovenian PrvaLiga after finishing in ninth place.

On 17 August 2011, Vinko signed a one-year contract with French Ligue 2 side Metz on a free transfer. FIFA later confirmed that Nafta is eligible to receive training compensation, however an appeal annulled such claim.

Career statistics

Honours
Nafta 1903
 Slovenian Cup runner-up: 2019–20
 Slovenian Third League: 2016–17

References

External links
Player profile at NZS 

1990 births
Living people
People from the Municipality of Lendava
Slovenian footballers
Slovenia youth international footballers
Slovenia under-21 international footballers
Association football wingers
Slovenian expatriate footballers
NK Nafta Lendava players
FC Metz players
ND Mura 05 players
SK Austria Klagenfurt players
Slovenian expatriate sportspeople in France
Expatriate footballers in France
Slovenian expatriate sportspeople in Austria
Expatriate footballers in Austria
Slovenian PrvaLiga players
Slovenian Second League players
Austrian Regionalliga players